{{Album ratings
| MC = 84/100
| rev1 = Allmusic
| rev1Score = 
| rev2 = The Guardian
| rev2Score = 
| rev3 = PopMatters
| rev3Score = favourable<ref>{{cite web| url=http://www.popmatters.com/pm/review/malinjesse-fine| title=Album review Jesse Malin: The Fine Art of Self Destruction| publisher=PopMatters| first=Adrien |last=Begrand |date=28 February 2003| accessdate=7 March 2012 }}</ref>
}}The Fine Art of Self Destruction'' is Jesse Malin's debut solo album. Released on December 24, 2002 in the UK and January 28, 2003 in the United States. It was produced by Ryan Adams (his album-production debut). The front cover photograph was taken at Delancey Street Subway, Manhattan, New York City.

Track listing

Personnel 
 Jesse Malin – vocals, acoustic guitar
 Johnny Pisano - bass guitar, upright bass, backing vocals
 Paul Garisto - drums
 Joe McGinty - piano, Hammond organ, Wurlitzer
 Toby Dammit - percussion
 Ryan Adams - electric guitars, backing vocals, keyboards
 Melissa Auf der Maur - backing vocals
 Richard Fortus - lead guitar on "Queen of the Underworld"
 Esko - guitar on "TKO"

References

Jesse Malin albums
2002 debut albums
Artemis Records albums